The following highways are numbered 773:

United States